The 1978 NAIA Soccer Championship was the 20th annual tournament held by the NAIA to determine the national champion of men's college soccer among its members in the United States and Canada.

Defending champions Quincy (IL) defeated Alabama–Huntsville in the final, 2–0, to claim the Hawks' eighth NAIA national title.

The final was  played in Huntsville, Alabama.

Qualification

The tournament field remained fixed at eight teams. Third-, fifth-, and seventh-placed finals remained in place alongside the national championship match.

Bracket

See also  
 1978 NCAA Division I Soccer Tournament
 1978 NCAA Division II Soccer Championship
 1978 NCAA Division III Soccer Championship

References 

NAIA championships
NAIA
NAIA Soccer Championship